The American Wood Council (AWC) is a trade association that represents North American wood products manufacturers.

North American membership includes companies and industry associations; among them, Boise Cascade LLC, Canfor USA/New South, Georgia-Pacific LLC, Interfor Corporation, Kapstone, Louisiana Pacific, Masonite, Norbord Inc., Plum Creek Timber, Potlatch Corp., Sierra Pacific Industries, West Fraser, West Rock Company, Weyerhaeuser Company, and the Canadian Wood Council.

History
AWC was re-chartered in June 2010, with a broader mandate than a former predecessor namesake. Up until 2010, the wood products industry was represented by the American Forest & Paper Association (AF&PA), which now represents pulp and paper manufacturers.

References

External links
American Wood Council, organizational website
Softwood Lumber Board
Reuse Wood Directory
American Forest & Paper Association
About AWC

Trade associations based in the United States
Timber industry